Phillip Noyce  (born April 29, 1950) is an Australian filmmaker. Since 1977, he has directed over 19 feature films in various genres, including historical drama (Newsfront, Rabbit-Proof Fence, The Quiet American); thrillers (Dead Calm, Sliver, The Bone Collector); and action films (Blind Fury, The Saint, Salt). He has also directed the Jack Ryan adaptations Patriot Games (1992) and Clear and Present Danger (1994) and the 2014 adaptation of Lois Lowry's The Giver.

He has worked at various times with such actors as Val Kilmer, Harrison Ford, Denzel Washington, Michael Caine, Angelina Jolie, Nicole Kidman, Meryl Streep, Rutger Hauer, and three films with Thora Birch over 25 years. He has also directed, written, and executive-produced television programmes in both Australia and North America, including The Cowra Breakout, Vietnam, Revenge, Roots, and Netflix's What/If.

Noyce's work has won him several accolades, including AACTA Awards for Best Film, Best Director, and a special Longford Lyell lifetime achievement award.

Life and career
Noyce was born in Griffith, New South Wales, attended high school at Barker College in Sydney and began making short films at the age of 18. A poster for a screening of "underground" films had captured his imagination and the 16 US and Australian experimental films ignited something else. Four months later he shot his first short film, the 15 minute Better to Reign in Hell, financed by selling roles to his friends.

In 1969, Noyce became the manager of the Sydney Filmmakers Co-op, a collective of filmmakers. With Jan Chapman, he ran the Filmmaker's Cinema for three years atop a socialist bookshop in Sydney, screening the short films of the directors who would go on to form the Australian New Wave: Gillian Armstrong, Peter Weir, Bruce Beresford, George Miller, Paul Cox. These were a generation of boomers who had grown up rarely seeing an Australian film, as British and American interests controlled distribution and exhibition Australia wide.

After graduating from Sydney University, he joined the Australian Film, Television and Radio School in 1973, and released his first professional film in 1975. Many of his films feature espionage, as Noyce grew up listening to his father's stories of serving with the Australian Commando unit Z Force during World War II.

After his debut feature, the medium-length Backroads (1977), Noyce achieved huge commercial and critical success with Newsfront (1978), which won Australian Film Institute (AFI) awards for Best Film, Director, Actor, Screenplay, and opened the London Film Festival and was the first Australian film to play at the New York Film Festival.

Noyce worked on two miniseries for Australian television with fellow Australian filmmaker George Miller: The Dismissal (1983) and The Cowra Breakout (1984). Miller also produced the film that brought Noyce to the attention of Hollywood studios – Dead Calm (1988) which launched the career of Nicole Kidman. After Dead Calm, Noyce went to America to direct Blind Fury starring Rutger Hauer for Tri-Star Pictures.

Moving with his young family to the United States in 1991, Noyce directed five films over the following eight years, of which Clear and Present Danger, starring Harrison Ford, was the most successful, critically and commercially, grossing $216 million. After 1999's Bone Collector starring Angelina Jolie and Denzel Washington, Noyce decided to return to his native Australia for Stolen Generations saga Rabbit-Proof Fence, which won the AFI Award for Best Film in 2002. He has described Rabbit-Proof Fence as "easily" his proudest moment as a director: "Showing that film to various Aboriginal communities around the country and seeing their response, because it gave validity to the experiences of the stolen generations." Although independently financed, the film was a huge hit with Australian audiences and sold worldwide.

Noyce was also lauded for The Quiet American, the 2002 adaptation of Graham Greene's novel, which gave Michael Caine an Academy Award Best Actor nomination and earned best director awards from London Film Critics' Circle and National Board of Review in the US. After the Apartheid-set Catch a Fire (2006) in South Africa, Noyce decided to make another big budget studio film with 2010's Salt starring Angelina Jolie, which proved to be his biggest commercial hit to date, making nearly $300 million worldwide.

In 2011, Noyce directed and executive produced the pilot for the ABC series Revenge and has since directed numerous TV pilots, including Netflix's What/If starring Renée Zellweger and the ongoing FOX Network hit The Resident, now in its 5th season. In 2017, he signed a first look deal with 20th Century Fox Television.

Above Suspicion, starring Emilia Clarke and Jack Huston, originally to be released in America in 2020 by Roadside Attractions was delayed until May 2021 due to the Coronavirus Pandemic.

In 2021, Noyce became executive producer on the film Show Me What You Got, written and directed by Svetlana Cvetko. "He clearly believed in our vision and ability to tell this story in the beautiful way we wanted, and just simply helped us enhance it," Cvetko says of Noyce in a 2022 FilmInk Interview.

The Desperate Hour (originally titled Lakewood), starring Naomi Watts, was released in the US by Roadside Attractions in March 2022.

In late 2021, a 17 feature and 10 shorts retrospective of Noyce's work was presented at the Cinémathèque Française in Paris.

Noyce's next film, Fast Charlie, a darkly comedic thriller starring Pierce Brosnan, Morena Baccarin and James Caan, written by Richard Wenk will be released in the US in August 2023.

Noyce will return to Australia in April 2023 to direct the first season of the TV series Resurrection Bay, written by Michael Petroni adapted from the novel by Emma Viskic.

Filmography

Films

Executive producer
 Show Me What You Got (2021)

Short films

Documentary films

Television 
TV movies
 Fact and Fiction (1980)
 Three Vietnamese Stories (1980)
 Mary and Martha (2013)

TV series

Unmade films
Simmonds and Newcombe (late 1970s) – about the manhunt for Simmonds and Newcombe
King Hit (late 1970s) – about the dismissal of the Whitlam government

Awards and nominations

References

Further reading
 Maltin, Leonard. Phillip Noyce Biography from Leonard Maltin's Movie Encyclopedia, imdb.com. Retrieved 16 August 2005.
 
 Petzke, Ingo: Backroads To Hollywood – Phillip Noyce. Pan Macmillan (Sydney) 2004
 Petzke, Ingo. Great Directors – Phillip Noyce Senses of Cinema. Retrieved 10 February 2007.
 Contemporary North American Film Directors: A Wallflower Critical Guide By Yoram Allon, Hannah Patterson, Del Cullen. Entry on Phillip Noyce Look inside at Google Book search

External links

1950 births
Australian film directors
Australian film producers
Australian screenwriters
Australian television directors
Australian television producers
Australian television writers
Living people
People from Griffith, New South Wales
Australian Film Television and Radio School alumni
People educated at Barker College